The 1832 Connecticut gubernatorial election was held on April 13, 1832. Incumbent governor and National Republican nominee John S. Peters was re-elected, defeating former senator and Democratic nominee Calvin Willey with 71.44% of the vote.

The Anti-Masonic Party in Connecticut was opposed to the platform of the National Republicans, and combined its forces with the Democrats in this race, supporting a ticket of Willey for governor and John M. Holley of Salisbury for lieutenant governor. Willey had previously been affiliated with the Anti-Jacksonians during his term in the United States Senate.

This was the last time the National Republican Party would win a Connecticut gubernatorial election.

General election

Candidates
Major party candidates

John S. Peters, National Republican
Calvin Willey, Democratic & Anti-Masonic

Results

References

1832
Connecticut
Gubernatorial